Ndubuisi Emmanuel Egbo  (born 25 July 1973) is a Nigerian 
football manager and former footballer.

Egbo played as a goalkeeper during his  professional career, most notably representing Tirana, winning with them three trophies. He was also a player of Nigeria national team, playing 12 matches and representing it in two tournaments of African Cup of Nations.

Club career
Egbo previously played for NITEL Vasco Enugu, NEPA Lagos and Julius Berger in the Nigeria Premier League, for Moroka Swallows in the South African Premier Soccer League, for El-Masry in the Egyptian Premier League, and for KF Tirana and Bylis Ballsh in the Albanian Superliga.

International career
Egbo has made several appearances for the full Nigeria national football team. He was a member of the Nigeria squad at the 2000 and 2002 African Cup of Nations.

Managerial career

On 17 October 2015, after the sacking of Shkëlqim Muça following 1–1 home draw against Flamurtari Vlorë, both assistants of Muça were appointed temporarily the new managers of KF Tirana. Egbo became the first ever Nigerian coach to lead a European team to a league title after his team were crowned 2019/2020 Albanian League champions, the team also qualified for the Uefa Champions League.

Managerial statistics
Last updated 31 August 2020

Honours

Club
Julius Berger

Nigeria Premier League: 1996

Al-Masry

Egypt Cup: 1997–98

KF Tirana
As Player
Albanian Cup: 2001–02
Albanian Supercup: 2002, 2003
Albanian Superliga: 2002–03 2003–04
As Manager
Albanian Superliga: 2019-20

References

External links
 
 FSHF player search

1973 births
Living people
People from Aba, Abia
Association football goalkeepers
Nigerian footballers
Nigeria international footballers
2000 African Cup of Nations players
2002 African Cup of Nations players
NEPA Lagos players
Bridge F.C. players
Al Masry SC players
Moroka Swallows F.C. players
KF Tirana players
KF Bylis Ballsh players
Nigerian expatriate footballers
Expatriate footballers in Egypt
Nigerian expatriate sportspeople in Egypt
Expatriate soccer players in South Africa
Nigerian expatriate sportspeople in South Africa
Expatriate footballers in Albania
Nigerian expatriate sportspeople in Albania
Nigerian football managers
KF Bylis Ballsh managers
KF Tirana managers
Kategoria Superiore players
Kategoria Superiore managers
NITEL Vasco Da Gama F.C. players
Ohod Club managers
Saudi First Division League managers
Expatriate football managers in Saudi Arabia
Nigerian expatriate sportspeople in Saudi Arabia